Party for National Reform (PNR) - is a national political movement registered with the Interior Ministry of the Democratic Republic of Congo, Decree No. 109/2010 of 15 June 2010. Its ideology is based on.

PNR’s headquarters is in Kinshasa. Its official website is: http://www.pnrcongo.net. Its leader is Mr. Delphin Kyubwa, National Chairman of the PNR.

External links 
 POTENTIAL - Article de presse du quotidien LE POTENTIEL - Édition 6005 of Friday, Octobre 8, 2010 
 http://fr.allafrica.com/stories/201010080587.html

Political parties in the Democratic Republic of the Congo